Sūrīd ibn Salhouk (also known as Saurit, Saurid, and more commonly known as Surid) is a legendary king from medieval Coptic and Islamic lore who is said to have lived before the biblical flood. In legends, Surid was often conflated with or identified as the biblical prophet Enoch, the Muslim prophet Idris, and Hermes Trismegistus. Surid, among other achievements, was often credited with building the Pyramids of Giza. One legend in particular relates how, three hundred years prior to the deluge, Surid had a terrifying dream of the world's end, and so he ordered the construction of the pyramids so that they might house all the knowledge of Egypt and survive into the present.

According to Martyn Smith, "The story of Surid and his antediluvian construction of the pyramids assigns to them a place in sacred history and establishes a neutral narrative ground upon which Muslims and Christians could agree".

See also
 Khufu

References

Further reading

Legendary Islamic people
Coptology
Enoch (ancestor of Noah)
Flood myths
Mythological kings
People whose existence is disputed
Primordial teachers